Jessica Kilian (born 8 December 1981 in Colombo, Sri Lanka) is a Swiss skeleton racer who has competed since 2002. Her best Skeleton World Cup finish was fourth at St. Moritz in January 2008.

Kilian's best finish at the FIBT World Championships was 16th in the women's event at Altenberg in 2008.

References
 FIBT profile

External links
 

1981 births
Living people
Swiss female skeleton racers
Swiss people of Sri Lankan descent
Sportspeople from Colombo